The AAW Tag Team Championship is a professional wrestling world tag team championship which is created and promoted by the American professional wrestling promotion All American Wrestling (AAW). There have been a total of 43 reigns shared between 36 different teams consisting of 66 distinctive champions. The current holders are Hustle And Soul (Calvin Tankman and Jah-C), who are in their first reign whilst is the second for Jah-C individually.

Title history

Combined reigns 

By team

By wrestler

See also
AAW Heavyweight Championship
AAW Heritage Championship
AAW Women's Championship

References

External links
AAW Official Website Title History
 AAW Tag Team Championship

Tag team wrestling championships
AAW Wrestling championships